The Kebithigollewa massacre occurred on 15 June 2006 when 60 civilians were killed by an LTTE claymore attack on a bus. The U.S and the SLMM claimed that LTTE was the perpetrator. However, the LTTE have denied accusations of being involved in the attack

Incident 

The Kebithigollewa massacre happened when a state owned bus was struck by two Claymore directional mines. 68 Sinhalese men, women and infants were killed as a result of this attack. The United States condemned the attack, noting: "This vicious attack bears all the hallmarks of the Liberation Tigers of Tamil Eelam. It is a clear violation of the Ceasefire Agreement that the Tamil Tigers claim to uphold".

The Sri Lanka Monitoring Mission (SLMM) claimed that it was highly probable that LTTE or supporters carried out the Kebithigollewa attack. The LTTE denied such allegations and condemned the attack, while placing the blame on Sri Lankan forces and paramilitary elements who it alleged carried out the attack to destroy efforts to resume the stalled peace process and to blame the LTTE. While the opponents of the LTTE accused it of carrying out the attack to provoke an ethnic backlash, pro-LTTE sources argue that the LTTE couldn't have had benefited from such a move; and that the Sri Lankan government stood to gain from the attack in terms of support from the international community (especially after the government's international donors threatened to cut off aid over reports of human rights abuses) and devising a pretext to conduct military raids on the LTTE under the guise of retaliation to aggression while pretending to maintain the Ceasefire Agreement. Skepticism was also raised about the possibility of LTTE infiltrating a predominantly Sinhalese area with heavy Army security presence, but Lt. Col. Anil Amarasekara has argued that Kebitigollewa, along with other Sinhalese border villages, had limited defense and was at risk of an LTTE attack. The SLMM alleged that the LTTE's motive for the attack was a deliberate retaliation for the recent killings of civilians and LTTE cadres in LTTE-controlled areas in the north and the east by the GoSL security forces who had also used claymore mines for the attacks.

References

Further reading 

 Gunaratna, Rohan. (1998). Sri Lanka's Ethnic Crisis and National Security, Colombo: South Asian Network on Conflict Research. 
 Gunaratna, Rohan. (1 October 1987). War and Peace in Sri Lanka: With a Post-Accord Report From Jaffna, Sri Lanka: Institute of Fundamental Studies. 
 Gunasekara, S.L. (4 November 2003). The Wages of Sin, 

2006 crimes in Sri Lanka
Attacks on civilians attributed to the Liberation Tigers of Tamil Eelam
Massacres in Sri Lanka
Liberation Tigers of Tamil Eelam attacks against buses
Liberation Tigers of Tamil Eelam attacks in Eelam War IV
Mass murder in 2006
Terrorist incidents in Sri Lanka in 2006